Cleft Peak is a prominent coastal peak in the Separation Range of Antarctica. The mountain's eastern side is cleft from summit to base by a huge fissure. Cleft Peak rises from the west part of the Separation Range and overlooks the terminus of Hood Glacier. It was named by the New Zealand Alpine Club Antarctic Expedition (1959–60) whose four members were landed in the vicinity by aircraft of U.S. Navy Squadron VX-6.

At the southwest base of the peak, narrow Prospect Spur descends westward to the edge of Hood Glacier. The spur was named by the New Zealand Alpine Club Antarctic Expedition, 1959–60, called Prospect because it was ascended to obtain a view up Hood Glacier in order to prospect a route to the south.

References 

Mountains of the Ross Dependency
Dufek Coast